Anthony Robin Windows (born 25 September 1942) is an English former cricketer. He played for Gloucestershire from 1960 to 1974 (but with only occasional appearances after 1966), and for Cambridge University from 1962 to 1964.

Windows attended Clifton College before going up to Jesus College, Cambridge. He took 8 for 78 for Gloucestershire against the touring West Indians in 1966. He toured Pakistan with the MCC Under-25 side in 1966-67.

References

External links

1942 births
Free Foresters cricketers
Living people
English cricketers
Gloucestershire cricketers
Cricketers from Bristol
People educated at Clifton College
Alumni of Jesus College, Cambridge
Cambridge University cricketers
A. E. R. Gilligan's XI cricketers
Marylebone Cricket Club Under-25s cricketers